WUKV (95.7 FM) is a Christian radio station broadcasting a Contemporary Christian music format. Licensed to Trion, Georgia, United States, the station serves the Rome, Georgia area. The station is currently owned by Educational Media Foundation. It has previously served as the flagship station for the Rome Braves.

Effective April 1, 2019, the-then WATG was acquired from TTA Broadcasting, Inc. by Educational Media Foundation for $200,000. The station coincidentally changed its call sign to WUKV. WUKV began broadcasting the K-Love network with a Contemporary Christian Music format covering NW Georgia and NE Alabama.

References

External links

Contemporary Christian radio stations in the United States
Radio stations established in 1997
1997 establishments in Georgia (U.S. state)
Educational Media Foundation radio stations
K-Love radio stations
UKV